Bramman is a 2014 Indian Tamil-language romantic drama film directed by Socrates, starring Sasikumar, Lavanya Tripathi, and Naveen Chandra, while Santhanam, Soori, and Jayaprakash play supporting roles. The film has music composed by Devi Sri Prasad and cinematography by Jomon T. John. The film released on 21 February 2014.

Plot
Siva is a movie lover in Coimbatore who leases a single screen theater out of passion. However, the theater is loss making and he is in financial trouble. Siva falls in love with Gayathri, but her parents want Siva to give up his passion towards theater business as it makes no money, for which Siva refuses and gives up his love. Siva gets a notice from the commercial tax department to pay his due of Rs. 5 lakhs or else the theater would be sealed. Siva decides to get help from his childhood friend Madhan Kumar, who is a leading film director in the Telugu film industry. 15 years ago, Madhan and Siva were school classmates and area friends, who were also big cinema freaks. Madhan's dad, a Union Government of India employee forbids Madhan to go to movies, as his grades dropped. Madhan, a sharp boy, barters with his dad that he will be allowed to pursue his dream of cinema direction if he achieves the marks prescribed by his dad till end of his studies. Madhan's dad agrees, and his family moves away from Coimbatore using a transfer. Madhan kept his end of the deal, and went to Film institute after college.

Siva reaches Chennai with the hope of meeting Madhan, but all his efforts go in vain. He stays with cinema assistant directors and repeatedly tries to meet Madhan. One day, Siva accidentally meets a producer named JP, to whom he introduces himself as an associate of Madhan and narrates a story which impresses JP. Siva is offered a chance to direct a movie, and JP hands over Rs. 5 lakhs as advance. However, Siva is scared as he has no clue about direction. Upon learning this, Madhan is furious and meets Siva but cannot identify him. Siva informs him that he is a big fan of Madhan.

JP finds out that Siva is not an associate of Madhan and is doubtful of him directing a movie. JP requests Siva to hand over the story rights to him so that he can make the movie with another director, to which Siva refuses. Siva learns that JP has actually planned to make the movie with Madhan, who is now debuting in the Tamil film industry. Siva feels happy and gives the story rights for free, to JP. Also, Madhan meets Gayathri through matchmakers and falls in love with her. He proposes a wedding arrangement, to which Gayathri's parents agree. Although Gayathri is not interested, she agrees to the wedding as Siva does not reciprocate her love. Madhan reaches Coimbatore for the wedding and suddenly remembers about his childhood friend Siva. He goes to Siva's house to invite him and is shocked upon seeing the photograph of Siva. He then understands the truth. Siva's friend Nandhu informs the sacrifices made by Siva for the success of Madhan, including his love towards Gayathri.

Madhan feels bad that he did not recognise Siva but feels proud that Siva was aware of Madhan's growth over these years. He stops his marriage, meets Siva in his theater and unites him with Gayathri.

Cast

 Sasikumar as Siva
 Lavanya Tripathi as Gayathri
 Naveen Chandra as Madhan Kumar
 Santhanam as Nandhu
 Soori as NBK
 Jayaprakash as JP
 Chaams as Chaams
 Gnanasambandam as Siva's father
 Vanitha Krishnachandran as Siva's mother
 Jaya Murali as Gayathri's mother
 Dushyanth Jayaprakash as Dushyanth, Siva's younger brother
 Malavika Menon as Lakshmi, Siva's younger sister
 Arjunan  as Lakshmi's ex-lover / CD shop owner
 Surekha Vani as College professor
 Anu Mohan as Siva's uncle
 Crane Manohar
 George Maryan as director
 Ajay Rathnam as Madhan Kumar's father
 Vaiyapuri as himself 
 Jai as himself (special appearance)
 Vaibhav as himself (special appearance)
 Madhu Shalini as herself (special appearance)
 Padmapriya Janakiraman as herself in an item number song "Vaada Vaada"

Production
Lavanya Tripathi played the female lead. She said "Santhanam is also part of the cast; so it won't be a serious film like the previous Sasikumar starrers". Soori was also part of the cast, who was earlier wrongly reported to have replaced Santhanam in the film. It was reported that Yuvan Shankar Raja would compose the music, but Devi Sri Prasad was signed as the music director. Naveen Chandra stated that he played the second lead as the friend of Sasikumar in the film.

The shooting happened mostly in Coimbatore. It also took place at Bharathiar University in April 2013. In October, the team consisting of director Socrates, Sasikumar, Lavanya, choreographer Raju Sundaram along with a 40-member crew flew to Venice and other parts of Italy and Switzerland to shoot a couple of songs, which is a first time for a Sasikumar film to be shot outside India. Padmapriya danced for a hot item song in the film.

Release
The satellite rights of the movie were sold to Sun TV.

Soundtrack

Critical reception
Baradwaj Rangan wrote, "With someone else at its centre, we might have said that Bramman is just about watchable, but with Sasikumar, we begin to wonder if Subramaniyapuram was a one-off". Behindwoods gave the film 2 stars out of 5 and wrote: "Bramman turns out to be a good tale by Socrates, that might have lacked a little vigour in the screenplay". Sify called Bramman a "passable commercial entertainer with all essential ingredients that will keep the pot boiling".

References

External links
 

2014 films
Films shot in Tamil Nadu
Films shot in Venice
Films shot in Switzerland
2010s Tamil-language films
2014 directorial debut films